Rajasthani may refer to:
 something of, from, or related to Rajasthan, a state of India
 Rajasthani languages, a group of languages spoken there
 Rajasthani people, the native inhabitants of the region
 Rajasthani architecture
 Rajasthani art
 Rajasthani cuisine
 Rajasthani literature, literature written in various genres starting from 1000 AD
 Rajasthani music
 Rajasthani painting

Language and nationality disambiguation pages